John McGonigle may refer to:

John P. McGonigle, American sheriff and convicted criminal
Johnny McGonigle (born 1944), British boxer

See also
John MacGonigle (fl. 1877–1884), American politician